In numerical optimization, the nonlinear conjugate gradient method generalizes the conjugate gradient method to nonlinear optimization. For a quadratic function 
 
 .
 
Whereas linear conjugate gradient seeks a solution to the linear equation 
, the nonlinear conjugate gradient method is generally 
used to find the local minimum of a nonlinear function 
using its gradient  alone. It works when the function is approximately quadratic near the minimum, which is the case when the function is twice differentiable at the minimum and the second derivative is non-singular there.

Given a function  of  variables to minimize, its gradient  indicates the direction of maximum increase.
One simply starts in the opposite (steepest descent) direction:
 

with an adjustable step length  and performs a line search in this direction until it reaches the minimum of :
 ,
 

After this first iteration in the steepest direction , the following steps constitute one iteration of moving along a subsequent conjugate direction , where :
 Calculate the steepest direction: ,
 Compute  according to one of the formulas below,
 Update the conjugate direction: 
 Perform a line search: optimize , 
 Update the position: ,
 
With a pure quadratic function the minimum is reached within N iterations (excepting roundoff error), but a non-quadratic function will make slower progress.  Subsequent search directions lose conjugacy requiring the search direction to be reset to the steepest descent direction at least every N iterations, or sooner if progress stops. However, resetting every iteration turns the method into steepest descent.  The algorithm stops when it finds the minimum, determined when no progress is made after a direction reset (i.e. in the steepest descent direction), or when some tolerance criterion is reached.

linear conjugate gradient method but have been obtained with line searches.
The conjugate gradient method can follow narrow (ill-conditioned) valleys, where the steepest descent method slows down and follows a criss-cross pattern.

 Fletcher–Reeves:
 
 Polak–Ribière:
 
 Hestenes-Stiefel:
 
 Dai–Yuan:
 .

These formulas are equivalent for a quadratic function, but for nonlinear optimization the preferred formula is a matter of heuristics or taste.

Algorithms based on Newton's method potentially converge much faster. There, both step direction and length are computed from the gradient as the solution of a linear system of equations, with the coefficient matrix being the exact Hessian matrix (for Newton's method proper) or an estimate thereof (in the quasi-Newton methods, where the observed change in the gradient during the iterations is used to update the Hessian estimate). For high-dimensional problems, the exact computation of the Hessian is usually prohibitively expensive, and even its storage can be problematic, requiring  memory (but see the limited-memory L-BFGS quasi-Newton method).

The conjugate gradient method can also be derived using optimal control theory. In this accelerated optimization theory, the conjugate gradient method falls out as a nonlinear optimal feedback controller,

for the double integrator system,

See also
 Broyden–Fletcher–Goldfarb–Shanno algorithm
 Conjugate gradient method
 L-BFGS (limited memory BFGS)
 Nelder–Mead method
 Wolfe conditions

References

Optimization algorithms and methods
Gradient methods